Mehdiabad (also Romanized as Mehdīābād) is a village in Torud Rural District, in the Central District of Shahrud County, Semnan Province, Iran. At the 2006 census, its population was 142, in 34 families.

References 

Populated places in Shahrud County